Phenomenon is the second Japanese-language studio album of the South Korean boy group Monsta X. It was released and distributed by Universal Music Japan on August 21, 2019. It is also the last Japanese album to feature Wonho, who left the group in October 2019.

Background and release 
The album was announced on June 18, 2019 as a surprise announcement, following a live performance. The album contains nine main tracks, with special tracks varying by versions. The album included two previously released Japanese versions of the Korean title tracks "Alligator" and "Shoot Out". 

The title track "X-Phenomenon" was pre-released on July 15, 2019 ahead of the album's full release. A music video was simultaneously released for the song.

Like their previous Japanese album, the album was released in three versions for the physical release; the regular version, and limited editions A and B. The regular version has the special track "Thriller", and limited editions A and B have the special tracks "Champagne" and "Polaroid", respectively.

In August and September 2019, following the release of the album, Monsta X held a Japanese tour.

Critical reception 
Chris Gillett of SCMP wrote that Phenomenon, with the exception of the Japanese versions of "Alligator" and "Shoot Out", presented "a different sound from their previous album Take.2 We Are Here", with "a less of the EDM focused style" and "a more aggressive tone".

Commercial performance 
"Livin' It Up" and the Japanese versions of "Alligator" and "Shoot Out" were all certified gold singles by RIAJ.

The album sold more than 56,000 copies in Japan, and debuted at number two on both Oricon Albums Chart and Billboard Japan Hot Albums chart.

Track listing

Charts

Album

Weekly charts

Songs

Weekly charts

Certification and sales

References 

2019 albums
Japanese-language albums
Universal Music Japan albums
Monsta X albums